Omvati Devi (born 1949) is a politician and a Member of Parliament elected from the Bijnor constituency in the Indian state of Uttar Pradesh being a Samajwadi Party candidate, who was a member of the 12th Lok Sabha.

Early life
Omvati was born in the year 1949 in Takhawali village in Bijnor,(Uttar Pradesh). She married R. K. Singh in June 1959 and they have a son and four daughters.

Education and career
Omvati completed her schooling from R.S.M. Degree College, Dhampur. She first joined the Uttar Pradesh Legislative Assembly in 1985. In 1998, she was elected to the 12th Lok Sabha. From 1998–99, she served as:
 Member, Committee on Labour and Welfare
 Member, Users' Committee, Northern Railway  
 Member, Consultative Committee, Ministry of Chemicals and Fertilizers

References

India MPs 1998–1999
Women in Uttar Pradesh politics
Articles created or expanded during Women's History Month (India) - 2014
1949 births
Living people
20th-century Indian women politicians
20th-century Indian politicians
Lok Sabha members from Uttar Pradesh
People from Bijnor district
Bahujan Samaj Party politicians from Uttar Pradesh
Members of the Uttar Pradesh Legislative Assembly
Samajwadi Party politicians
Bharatiya Janata Party politicians from Uttar Pradesh
Indian National Congress politicians